John Graves Cobblestone Farmhouse is an American historic home located at Junius in Seneca County, New York.  It is a late Federal style, two-story, three-bay wide side hall structure, with a one-story frame wing. It was built about 1837 and is constructed of irregularly sized and variously colored field cobbles. The house is among the approximately 18 surviving cobblestone buildings in Seneca County.

It was listed on the National Register of Historic Places in 2008.

See also
 Cobblestone Farmhouse at 1229 Birdsey Road
 Cobblestone Farmhouse at 1027 Stone Church Road
 Cobblestone Farmhouse at 1111 Stone Church Road

References

Houses on the National Register of Historic Places in New York (state)
Federal architecture in New York (state)
Cobblestone architecture
Houses completed in 1837
Houses in Seneca County, New York
National Register of Historic Places in Seneca County, New York